Rybitwy  is a village in the administrative district of Gmina Połaniec, within Staszów County, Świętokrzyskie Voivodeship, in south-central Poland.

The village has a population of  327.

Demography 
According to the 2002 Poland census, there were 310 people residing in Rybitwy village, of whom 51.6% were male and 48.4% were female. In the village, the population was spread out, with 24.5% under the age of 18, 37.7% from 18 to 44, 18.7% from 45 to 64, and 18.7% who were 65 years of age or older.
 Figure 1. Population pyramid of village in 2002 — by age group and sex

References

Villages in Staszów County